Pareugoa is a monotypic moth genus in the subfamily Arctiinae. Its single species, Pareugoa multistrigata, is found in Assam, India. Both the genus and species were first described by George Hampson, the genus in 1900 and the species two years earlier.

References

Lithosiini
Monotypic moth genera
Moths of Asia